The following elections occurred in the year 1838.

North America

United States
 1838 Illinois gubernatorial election
 1838 New York gubernatorial election
 1838 Pennsylvania gubernatorial election
 1838 United States House of Representatives elections
 United States Senate elections, 1838 and 1839

See also
 :Category:1838 elections

1838
Elections